Ivan Milas (born 30 March 1975 in Imotski) is a Croatian football player. He is currently coach of Sava Strmec

Career
He joined RAEC Mons in January 2005 from Zrinjski Mostar, signing a six-month deal, but later was given a long-term contract. Milas left Mons in January 2008 and played for KAS Eupen in the Belgian Second Division.

References

External links
 

1975 births
Living people
Sportspeople from Imotski
Association football defenders
Croatian footballers
NK Hrvatski Dragovoljac players
HNK Šibenik players
NK Zagreb players
HNK Rijeka players
HŠK Zrinjski Mostar players
R.A.E.C. Mons players
K.A.S. Eupen players
Croatian Football League players
Belgian Pro League players
Challenger Pro League players
Croatian expatriate footballers
Expatriate footballers in Belgium
Croatian expatriate sportspeople in Belgium